Francis William Sides (15 December 1913 – 25 August 1943) was an Australian cricketer. He played 14 first-class cricket matches for Victoria between 1937 and 1939.

See also
 List of Victoria first-class cricketers
 List of cricketers who were killed during military service

References

External links
 

1913 births
1943 deaths
Australian cricketers
Queensland cricketers
Victoria cricketers
Sportspeople from Mackay, Queensland
Australian military personnel killed in World War II
Australian Army personnel of World War II
Australian Army soldiers